Black Friday is a 1940 American horror film starring Boris Karloff and Bela Lugosi.

Screenwriter Curt Siodmak would revisit this theme again in Donovan's Brain (1953) and Hauser's Memory (1970).

Plot 
Dr. Ernest Sovac is taken from his cell for his execution, but is able to give notes to a reporter, which recount his story, as he is led to a chamber.

Sometime earlier, Sovac's best friend, bookish college professor George Kingsley, is run down while crossing a street. In order to save his friend's life, Sovac implants part of another man's brain into the professor's. Unfortunately, the other man was a gangster who was involved in the accident and was apparently heading for the electric chair, according to the police. The professor recovers but at times behaves like the gangster. Sovac is horrified but also intrigued, because the gangster has hidden $500,000 somewhere in New York City. The doctor continues to treat his unwitting friend and persuades him to take a vacation in New York; Sovac hopes this will revive the gangster's memory so that Kingsley will lead him to the fortune which he hopes to spend on a laboratory. Unfortunately for the doctor's plans, the professor's personality change becomes more extreme, including plotting revenge against other members of his former gang. When Kingsley (behaving as a gangster) attempts to murder the doctor's daughter, Sovac shoots him dead.

Returning to present, Sovac is executed.

Cast
Boris Karloff as Dr. Ernest Sovac
Stanley Ridges as Professor George Kingsley/Red Cannon
Bela Lugosi as Eric Marnay
Anne Nagel as Sunny Rogers
Anne Gwynne as Jean Sovac
Virginia Brissac as Mrs. Margaret Kingsley
Edmund MacDonald as Frank Miller
Paul Fix as William Kane
Murray Alper as Bellhop
 Gonzalo Meroño as Richard Steward

Production
The original story treatment was titled Friday the Thirteenth before being changed to Black Friday. In January 1939, Universal announced that Willis Cooper was working on the script, with Bela Lugosi and Boris Karloff probably to star. In August, Curt Siodmak and Eric Taylor were assigned to write the script.

Universal cast Lugosi as the doctor and Karloff as the professor. For unknown reasons, Karloff insisted on playing the doctor. Rather than a straight switch though, Lugosi was given the minor role of another gangster, while character actor Stanley Ridges was brought in to play the professor. In later years, writer Curt Siodmak claimed Karloff felt he was not a good enough actor to play the dual role of the kindly professor-turned-murderous gangster, but it is more likely that his appearance and voice could not be changed completely enough to make the switch convincing. (Karloff played a dual role in the 1935 film The Black Room but the two characters were identical twins.)

The film provided a rare opportunity for Ridges.

By December, the title had changed to Black Friday. Arthur Lubin reportedly got the job of directing on the strength of his work on The Big Guy. Filming started 27 December 1939.

During filming, Manley Hall reportedly hypnotised Lugosi on set.

Release
Black Friday had its world premiere in Chicago on February 29, 1940. It was released theatrically April 12, 1940 where it was distributed by Universal Pictures.

Criticism
The New York Times at the time of release stated: "Lugosi's terrifying talents are wasted... but Karloff is in exquisite artistic form... good holiday fun."

Diabolique magazine in 2019 described it as "Lubin's first film to have any kind of lasting legacy... because it features both Boris Karloff and Bela Lugosi, though neither share a scene together. It's a sort of gangster-horror film that involves a brain transplant (Curt Siodmak, who worked on the script, loved brain transplants). Stanley Ridges plays a part clearly meant for Karloff with Karloff playing a role that should have been played by Lugosi and Lugosi being wasted in a part that could have been played by anyone. The film is no classic but it is crisp and no-nonsense, taking advantage of Universal's studio resources, with excellent tempo; Joe Dante later commented it was more like a Warner Bros film in that respect than a Universal one, a judgement that could be made of many Lubin movies from this period."

Home media
Black Friday was released on a DVD as part of The Bela Lugosi Collection on September 6, 2005. Dave Kehr of The New York Times noted that the compilation compiled The Black Cat, The Raven, The Invisible Ray and Black Friday on a single disc, stating that the video quality was acceptable but contained "a lot of video compression".

See also
 List of American films of 1940
 Boris Karloff filmography
 Bela Lugosi filmography

References

Footnotes

Sources

External links

 
Joe Dante on Black Friday at Trailers from Hell

1940 films
1940 horror films
American science fiction horror films
American black-and-white films
1940s English-language films
Films directed by Arthur Lubin
Films about brain transplants
Mad scientist films
Films with screenplays by Curt Siodmak
1940s science fiction horror films
Universal Pictures films
American gangster films
American psychological thriller films
1940s American films